Semra Özdamar (born 11 January 1956) is a Turkish actress. She is best known for her performance as Semra Hoca in Hababam Sınıfı Sınıfta Kaldı.

References

External links
 

People from Bursa
Turkish film actresses
1956 births
Living people
Best Actress Golden Orange Award winners